Gonocephalus sophiae, the Negros forest dragon is a species of lizards endemic to the Philippines. It is found between 0 and 1200 m above sea level on the islands of Negros, Mindanao and Panay, and possibly on Siargao, Luzon, Samar, Palawan and the Calamian Islands. The species is oviparous, and lays eggs in small holes dug in the banks of forest rivers. It is often confused with G. interruptus and G. semperi and therefore remains poorly characterized. Adults reach a total length of ca. 30 cm and feed mostly on insects.

References

Gonocephalus
Reptiles of the Philippines
Reptiles described in 1845
Taxa named by John Edward Gray